Motek Cultural Initiative was established in 2011 in Toronto, Ontario, Canada in order to showcase Israeli music. Its programs include annual galas, concerts, music festivals, workshops, lectures, advocacy events, and Q&A sessions. Motek is Hebrew slang for "Sweetheart". Like "Mon Cheri", and "Habibi" it is a gender-neutral term of endearment.

History
Upon moving to Canada from Israel, it became evident to Motek's founder, Ravid Dahan, that few organizations in North America were celebrating Israeli musical artists in their programming, even though there was a growing demand for it in Jewish and world music communities. Having worked with the most prominent talents, including Israel's top-ten musical artists, Ravid created Motek to promote Israeli music while bridging the gap between local Jewish and Israeli communities. The charity hosts an annual gala in Toronto venues.

Events

First annual gala
On March 18, 2012, Motek's inaugural gala and concert featured The Idan Raichel Project, accompanied by a 10-piece orchestra. The concert, held at the Queen Elizabeth Theatre (Toronto) in Toronto had a sold-out crowd of 1,500. The Moroccan themed after party featured belly-dancers, Dj's, and authentic cuisine.

Second annual gala
On April 28, 2013, Tel-Aviv was transported to Toronto with Motek's Is Rock second annual gala featuring rock band Mashina, hip-pop band Hadag Nahash and Yael Deckelbaum. The celebration of Israeli culture gave audiences music, cuisine and a market place.

Third annual gala
On May 10, 2014, Motek hosted its third annual gala in association with Massey Hall. An audience of 2,500 enjoyed a Canadian/Israeli experience with a fusion of Middle Eastern, West African, Latin American, Indian and Caribbean sounds. Musicians included The Idan Raichel Project, singer Raichel, and a 10-piece orchestra.

Fourth annual gala
On May 7, 2015 Motek hosted its fourth annual gala, featuring Shlomi Shabat accompanied by a 12 piece ensemble. The concert was held at the Queen Elizabeth Theatre (Toronto) in Toronto.

Sponsorship
Motek offers sponsorship opportunities to fund the distribution of Israeli artists in North America.

References

External links

Israeli culture
Music organizations based in Canada
Non-profit organizations based in Toronto
Jewish Canadian culture